Median income in Spain has declined significantly since the recession, in some cases, such as Catalonia, median income has declined by 9.6% since 2009. Median income differs from GDP per capita because the per capita is a mean value, which can exaggerate extreme values such as the very rich or the very poor. Median income represents the 50th percentile of income, meaning that half of people earn less than this value and half of people earn more than this value. The 2014 median monthly income in Spain is listed below. The two autonomous cities of Spain are excluded from this list. These values are paid 13 times per year, not 12 as in every month. As of 2014, the median income for all of Spain was €1,634, which is paid in 13 payments per year.

List of autonomous communities by median income

References 
http://www.lavanguardia.com/vangdata/20150519/54431721672/salario-medio-espana-ue.html| Median Income by Community

Autonomous communities by median income
Median income
Autonomous communities by median income
Gross state product
Spain, median income